Christopher Nöthe (born 3 January 1988) is a German professional footballer who played as a  forward.

Career
Born in Castrop-Rauxel, North Rhine-Westphalia, Nöthe made his debut on the professional league level in the Bundesliga for Borussia Dortmund on 29 September 2007 coming on as a substitute in the 74th minute in a game against Karlsruher SC. He started in the next game, but was substituted and only played in one more league game for Borussia that season.

He represented Germany at the youth level once in 2009, in a 6–0 win over San Marino national under-21 football team.

Nöthe retired from playing in summer 2019, due to injury problems and upon expiration of his contract at Arminia Bielefeld.

Honours
 DFB-Pokal finalist: 2007–08

References

External links
 
 

1988 births
Living people
People from Castrop-Rauxel
Sportspeople from Münster (region)
German footballers
Footballers from North Rhine-Westphalia
Association football forwards
Germany youth international footballers
Germany under-21 international footballers
Bundesliga players
2. Bundesliga players
Borussia Dortmund players
Borussia Dortmund II players
Rot-Weiß Oberhausen players
SpVgg Greuther Fürth players
FC St. Pauli players
Arminia Bielefeld players